Harvey Girls Forever! (originally titled Harvey Street Kids in its first season, then retroactively retitled) is an American animated comedy television series produced by Brendan Hay and Aliki Theofilopoulos for DreamWorks Animation Television, and is based on comic book characters from Harvey Comics. It premiered June 29, 2018 on Netflix and originally concluded on January 10, 2020.

Premise 
From long kickball games through the many flavors of ice cream to an impressive climbing tree, most days on Harvey Street feels like a weekend. Energetic Audrey, intelligent Dot and kindhearted Lotta are BFFs (short for Best Friends Forever) and the street's guardians. They try to keep Harvey Street great and start their wacky afternoon adventures.

Episodes

Voice cast 
 Stephanie Lemelin as Audrey
 Lauren Lapkus as Lotta
 Kelly McCreary as Dot
 Grey Griffin as Lucretia / Frufru / The Harvey Street Bow (usually abbreviated as just "The Bow")
 Atticus Shaffer as Melvin
 Danny Pudi as Tiny
 Utkarsh Ambudkar as Fredo
 Roger Craig Smith as Pinkeye / Bobby the Elder
 Jamaal Hepburn as Gerald
 Cree Summer as Zoe
 Chelsea Peretti as Maria
 Nat Faxon as Stu
 Jack Quaid as Richie Rich 
 Bobby Moynihan as Casper
 Anna Camp as Chevron
 Dee Bradley Baker as Raccoons
 Chris Diamantopoulos as Additional voices
 Joey McIntyre, Nick Lachey, Joey Fatone, and Shawn Stockman as Crush4U

Production 
Harvey Girls Forever! was dawned by artist Katie Rice in 2014 up until 2015. The show started production in Glendale, California on October 9, 2016. The second season was released on May 10, 2019 and was retitled Harvey Girls Forever! The third season premiered on November 12, 2019 introducing Richie Rich in the series. Jake Brennan did not reprise his role of Richie from the previous Netflix Richie Rich series. The fourth and final season introducing Casper the Friendly Ghost, premiered on January 10, 2020.

Music 
Music and songs are a central feature of Harvey Girls Forever! with showrunners Brendan Hay and Aliki Theofilopoulos creating a fictional boy band named Crush4U made up of actual boy band members to be the subject of affection for character Lotta. “We've gotten to work... with New Kids on the Block's Joey McIntyre, Boyz II Men's Shawn Stockman, NSYNC's Joey Fatone and 98 Degrees' Nick Lachey in our Harvey Street world created boy band," said Aliki to comicbook.com. Original songs were produced by composers Jay Vincent and Ryan Lofty. As part of the promotion for Harvey Girls Forever! season two the songs were made available for free download.

Merchandise 
CustomInk is operating official Harvey Girls Forever! products.

Release 
The series premiered on Netflix on June 29, 2018, and its first two seasons are available for purchase on VUDU, YouTube, Amazon Prime and Google Play. It also set broadcast on Family CHRGD in Canada and Télétoon+ in France.

Reception

The series was received positively. Emily Ashby of Common Sense Media described the series as "lots of playground fun" and said that while there aren't "deep learning takeaways," the series is fun in a "playful, adult-free childhood experience way." Ashby also said that the personalities of the characters are exaggerated, but there is a "lot that's positive" in a series which captures the "joy of childhood."

References

External links 
 Harvey Girls Forever! on Netflix
 Harvey Girls Forever! at DreamWorks
 

2010s American animated television series
2010s American musical comedy television series
2018 American television series debuts
2020 American television series endings
2020s American animated television series
2020s American musical comedy television series
American children's animated adventure television series
American children's animated comedy television series
American children's animated musical television series
Animated television series about children
English-language Netflix original programming
Netflix children's programming
Slapstick comedy
Television series by DreamWorks Animation
Television shows based on Harvey Comics
Television shows set in Oklahoma